The following are the national records in athletics in Puerto Rico maintained by its national athletics federation: Federación de Atletismo de Puerto Rico (FAPUR).

Outdoor

Key to tables:

+ = en route to a longer distance

h = hand timing

A = affected by altitude

y = denotes one mile

NWI = no wind information

OT = oversized track (> 200m in circumference)

Men

Women

Mixed

Indoor

Men

Women

Notes

References
General
World Athletics Statistic Handbook 2022: National Outdoor Records
World Athletics Statistic Handbook 2022: National Indoor Records
Specific

External links
FAPUR official web site

Puerto Rico
Records
Athletics
Athletics